Khairy Jamaluddin Abu Bakar (born 10 January 1976) is a Malaysian politician and radio presenter. Alongside being a radio presenter for Hot FM, he became one of the Members of the Board and Youth Advisor at JDT, as well as a Visiting Senior Fellow at the ISEAS-Yusof Ishak Institute. He most recently served as Minister of Health in the Barisan Nasional (BN) administration under former Prime Minister Ismail Sabri Yaakob from August 2021 to November 2022.

A former member of the United Malays National Organisation (UMNO), Khairy was the Member of Parliament (MP) for Rembau from March 2008 to November 2022. He was the Youth Chief of UMNO from March 2009 to June 2018. He served as Minister of Youth and Sports in the BN administration under former Prime Minister Najib Razak from May 2013 to May 2018. After the 2020 Malaysian political crisis, Khairy took on the role of Minister of Science, Technology and Innovation in the Perikatan Nasional (PN) administration under former Prime Minister Muhyiddin Yassin from March 2020 until August 2021, when the cabinet resigned. During the COVID-19 pandemic in Malaysia, Khairy took on the role of Coordinating Minister of the COVID-19 National Immunization Program (PICK) from February 2021 to August 2021, and later was Minister of Health. Khairy lost his parliamentary seat in the 2022 general election.

Early life and education
Khairy is the only son of a former diplomat, Dato' Jamaluddin Abu Bakar, a Malay of Minangkabau descent and Datin Dato' Rahmah Abdul Hamid, an ethnic Malay housewife of Kedahan ancestry.

His late father, Jamaluddin was a senior diplomatic officer in the Ministry of Foreign Affairs, retiring as the Malaysian High Commissioner to the United Kingdom. Dato' Jamaluddin has since died of throat cancer. Khairy's mother, Rahmah Abdul Hamid, has been heavily involved in volunteer work throughout her life although she was a housewife and never had an employment history, whilst his late paternal grandfather, Abu Bakar, was a community leader in his hometown of Kampung Kota, Rembau.

Khairy was born in Kuwait City, Kuwait. He had his secondary education at the United World College of South East Asia in Singapore and furthered his tertiary studies at Oxford University and University College London (UCL) in the United Kingdom. While at Oxford, he studied at St Hugh's College, and graduated with a bachelor's degree in Philosophy, Politics, and Economics (PPE). In 1998, he completed his master's degree in Legal and Political Theory at UCL.

Early career
After leaving university, Khairy worked as a journalist for a period. He served as a presenter on the talkshow Dateline Malaysia. He also had a stint working for The Economist in 1999. Thereafter, Khairy became a Special Officer in the office of Abdullah Badawi, who was then the Deputy Prime Minister of Malaysia. He was Abdullah's Deputy Principal Private Secretary from 2003 to 2004.

He was selected as a Young Global Leader by the World Economic Forum in Davos, Switzerland. He has written for major publications including The Economist, Time and the Wall Street Journal.

He became closely involved in football during his pre-parliamentary career. He holds a number of high-profile positions in the Malaysian football scene, and is involved in a number of football-related associations. In 2006, Khairy teamed-up with radio DJ Jason Lo (with whom he attended high school in Singapore) to produce the football-based reality TV show MyTeam.

On 9 September 2007, Khairy was chosen uncontested as the Vice-President of the Football Association of Malaysia (FAM) during the 44th FAM Congress, to serve from 2007 to 2010, replacing Tengku Mahkota Pahang then, Tengku Abdullah Sultan Ahmad Shah.

Political career

UMNO Youth and PMO officer

Under the prime ministership of his father-in-law (2003–2009), Khairy rose to prominence within UMNO and Malaysian politics generally. He became the deputy chief of UMNO's youth wing and served as a close personal adviser to Abdullah. Khairy's perceived influence on Abdullah made both men a target for criticism, including from Abdullah's predecessor Mahathir Mohamad. On this allegation, Khairy replied that "I am a pretty easy scapegoat. [But] the decisions Dr. Mahathir is unhappy with are entirely made by the Prime Minister and the cabinet."

Election to parliament
In the 2008 general election, Khairy was elected to the federal Parliament for the seat of Rembau in the state of Negeri Sembilan. The following year he was elected as the Chief of UMNO Youth, defeating Khir Toyo and Mukhriz Mahathir.

In his first term in parliament, Khairy involved himself in contentious policy debates. He expressed his view that Malaysia should repeal the Printing Presses and Publications Act, and abolish the annual Home Ministry licensing requirement, through the creation of an independent body which will enforce a self-regulatory mechanism of the system similar to the United Kingdom's Press Complaints Commission. He also spoke against the Malaysian Communications and Multimedia Commission's blocking of the popular and often anti-government website Malaysia Today, citing that the move was a "blatant and crude employment of state power" and "is inconsistent with the widening roads of democratic highways." He also called for an end to the Mahathir-era policy of teaching science and maths in English. In September 2008, Khairy called for the reversal of the policy, citing that the policy had failed and only caused burden to students. He regularly debated non-government and opposition figures in public, including Ambiga Sreenevasan on the transparency of the Election Commission of Malaysia (EC), and senior Parti Keadilan Rakyat (PKR) leader, and close Anwar Ibrahim ally, Rafizi Ramli on higher education loans.

Ministerial career
After retaining his parliamentary seat in the 2013 general election, Prime Minister Najib Razak elevated Khairy to the Cabinet as Minister for Youth and Sports. Later in 2013, he was re-elected to the presidency of UMNO Youth.

During his ministerial post, Malaysia successfully hosted the 2017 SEA Games and emerged as the overall gold medals tally winner. Just before the 2018 general election (GE14), Khairy and his ministry was put in charge of Najib's launched Transformasi Nasional 2050 (TN50) concept but it had somehow fallen through due to the GE14 results, which saw the downfall of the BN federal government. Khairy also lost his cabinet position despite retaining his parliamentary seat.

Return to cabinet
Khairy returned to Cabinet in March 2020 to serve as Minister of Science, Technology, and Innovation under new Prime Minister Muhyiddin Yassin's administration led by Perikatan Nasional (PN) following the Sheraton Move. His appointment as Minister of MOSTI was during the COVID-19 pandemic in Malaysia. He has signed an agreement with China for Malaysia to be given priority access to COVID-19 vaccines developed in China. In February 2021, Khairy was appointed as the Coordinating Minister for the National COVID-19 Immunisation Program. He led the Special Task Force to manage the implementation of the vaccination process.

During the 2022 Malaysian general election, Khairy was sent by his UMNO party leaders to contest Sungai Buloh parliamentary seat, he lost to Parti Keadilan Rakyat candidate Ramanan Ramakrishnan by a narrow margin.

Expulsion from UMNO 
In the aftermath of the 2022 Malaysian general election, Khairy and several UMNO leaders called for party leader, deputy prime minister Ahmad Zahid Hamidi to resign. On 27 January 2023, he was sacked from the party by the UMNO supreme council.

Army reservist
In 2010, Khairy signed-up the Rejimen Askar Wataniah or Territorial Army as a reservist after completing one month of basics recruit training in Negeri Sembilan and Johor in May 2010. He then completed a five-week basic static parachuting course conducted by the army's Special Warfare Centre with 78 others to earn his paratrooper jump wings in February 2011. In January 2014, he was appointed as the Commander of the 508 Territorial Army Regiment located in Rasah, Negeri Sembilan. On 26 October 2016, Khairy was elevated from the rank of 'Colonel' to 'Brigadier-General' effective 14 January 2015. This makes him the first Cabinet minister to be a commissioned reserved military officer rank after going through various courses conducted by the Territorial Army, and he continues to lead the 508 Territorial Army Regiment until his resignation in 2018 after the GE14 quoting his presence was no longer welcomed.

Controversies and issues

Relation with Abdullah Badawi 
Khairy was alleged to be running the country government through his control of the ‘Fourth Floor Boys’ – a group of young professionals who manned the policy-making unit of the PM's office when his father-in-law Abdullah was Prime Minister between 2004 and 2009. Khairy amidst then was a political novice with no experience in government himself even held the posts of ‘special officer’ and Deputy Principal Private Secretary (2003-2004) in the Prime Minister's Office (PMO).

After resigning from the PMO in 2004, Khairy joined a merchant bank, ECM Libra. In 2005, one year after Abdullah became prime minister, Khairy helped in the merger between ECM Libra Capital Bhd and the Malaysian government-owned Avenue Capital Resources Bhd. A year later in 2006, the three founding members of ECM Libra – Lim Kian Onn, Kalimullah Masheerul Hassan, and David Chua – announced that they were each selling 1% of the company shares they owned to Khairy. The deal was transacted at 71 cents per share for a total of approximately US$2.6 million where Khairy was able to finance it through a soft loan from the founders.

Youth and Sports Ministry corruption scandal 
In 2016, Khairy was slammed over his responsibility as he embroiled in the controversy surrounding the RM100 million corruption scandal plaguing the Youth and Sports Ministry he led when a senior official who had allegedly to have covertly siphoned off the ministry's funds and lived a lavish lifestyle over the past six years was arrested by Malaysian Anti-Corruption Commission (MACC).

Participation in 2017 SEA Games 
Khairy controversially competed for the Malaysian polo team at the 2017 Kuala Lumpur SEA Games he was encharged as Minister for Youth and Sports himself albeit the team secured a gold medal in the men's team polo event winning over Thailand. Somehow his credibility and contribution of the national polo team were questioned and had raised the dissatisfaction from Sultan Ibrahim Iskandar who even challenged him to play against his Johor state polo team. The event had led to Khairy seeking and granted an audience with the sultan at the palace to resolve the predicament caused immediately.

Personal life
Khairy is the son-in-law of the fifth Malaysian Prime Minister Abdullah Ahmad Badawi. In October 2001, he married Nori Abdullah (born 1976), the daughter of Abdullah, and his first wife, Endon Mahmood (1940–2005). The couple have three sons, Jibreil Ali (born 2007), Timor Abdullah (born 2008) and Raif Averroes (born 2015). In April 2016 Khairy opened up about his second son, Timor who has Autism Spectrum Disorder (ASD).

Election results

Filmography

Film

Television

Radiography

Radio

Honours  
  Malaysian Armed Forces :
  Warrior of the Most Gallant Order of Military Service (PAT) (2016)

See also
Rembau (federal constituency)

References

External links

 Official website
 

Living people
1976 births
People from Kuwait City
Malaysian people of Malay descent
Malaysian Muslims
Malaysian people of Minangkabau descent
Citizens of Malaysia through descent
People educated at a United World College
Alumni of University College London
Alumni of St Hugh's College, Oxford
Members of the Dewan Rakyat
Government ministers of Malaysia
Former United Malays National Organisation politicians
Health ministers of Malaysia
Malaysian polo players
Southeast Asian Games gold medalists for Malaysia
Southeast Asian Games medalists in polo
Competitors at the 2017 Southeast Asian Games
21st-century Malaysian politicians
Independent politicians in Malaysia